Sun Valley Cyclone is a 1946 American Western film in the Red Ryder film series directed by R. G. Springsteen, written by Earle Snell, and starring Wild Bill Elliott, Robert Blake, Alice Fleming, Roy Barcroft, Kenne Duncan and Eddy Waller. It was released on May 10, 1946, by Republic Pictures.

Plot

Cast  
Wild Bill Elliott as Red Ryder 
Alice Fleming as The Duchess
Robert Blake as Little Beaver 
Monte Hale as Jeff
Roy Barcroft as Blackie Blake
Kenne Duncan as Dow
Eddy Waller as Major Harding
Tom London as Sheriff
Edmund Cobb as Luce
Ed Cassidy as Colonel Roosevelt 
George Chesebro as Shorty
Rex Lease as Army Sergeant
Thunder as Red's new Horse

References

External links 
 

1946 films
American Western (genre) films
1946 Western (genre) films
Republic Pictures films
Films directed by R. G. Springsteen
Films based on comic strips
Films based on American comics
American black-and-white films
1940s English-language films
1940s American films
Red Ryder films